Psammophora nissenii is a species of plant in the family Aizoaceae. It is endemic to Namibia.  Its natural habitat is cold desert. It is threatened by habitat loss.

References

Flora of Namibia
Aizoaceae
Least concern plants
Taxonomy articles created by Polbot
Taxa named by Kurt Dinter